Arcadia Valley station is a passenger rail station in Arcadia, Missouri. The station is located on Amtrak's Texas Eagle line.

Background
Passenger service in the Arcadia Valley was once served by St. Louis, Iron Mountain and Southern Railway with a northbound depot in Arcadia and a southbound depot in Ironton. A new depot was constructed by Missouri Pacific in 1941 to consolidate the depots in Arcadia and Ironton. The new depot was called Arcadia-Ironton to assuage bickering between the two towns on its naming. Passenger service ceased in 1965 and the depot is currently occupied by the Arcadia Valley Chamber of Commerce and the Iron County Historical Society.

The proposed train station began in 2010 when Our Town Tomorrow coordinated with Chamber Tourism Committee for Arcadia Valley to pursue an Amtrak stop. In 2012, Amtrak, MoDOT, Union Pacific, and community members came forward to work together drafting documents and secure funds for the new train station.  After securing over $600,000 in funds needed to construct the new station, ground was broken in April 2016.  The station was completed in October, and was formally opened with a ribbon cutting and ceremonial train stop for dignitaries on November 17, 2016. Regular passenger service commenced on November 20, 2016.

See also
List of Amtrak stations

References

External links

Arcadia Valley Amtrak Station (USA Rail Guide – Train Web)

Amtrak stations in Missouri
Former Missouri Pacific Railroad stations
Railway stations in the United States opened in 2016
1941 establishments in Missouri
2016 establishments in Missouri
Railway stations in the United States opened in 1941